The Copa Faulcombridge is a professional tennis tournament played on clay courts. It is part of the Association of Tennis Professionals (ATP) Challenger Tour. It is held in Valencia, Spain, and it is named after Alfred Faulconbridge (1864–1932), founder of what today is the Valencia Tennis Club.

Past finals

Singles

Doubles

References

ATP Challenger Tour
Clay court tennis tournaments
Tennis tournaments in Spain